Venio Losert (born 25 July 1976) is a retired Croatian handball player who played as a goalkeeper. He is currently the goalkeeping coach of Egypt.

Losert was born in Zavidovići, SR Bosnia and Herzegovina, grew up in Slavonski Brod, SR Croatia.

Winning the first medal at the age of 19 at 1996 Summer Olympics in Atlanta, when Croatia won the first gold medal as an independent nation, he is considered the youngest debutant of the team.

Losert was also the member of the golden national handball team that won the first place at the 2004 Summer Olympics in Athens.

As a youngster he joined Badel Zagreb, the strongest team in the country and was part of the team who won the European Cup in 1992 and 1993. In total he won 7 league titles and 7 cups with Badel Zagreb. In 1999, Venio Losert moved into Spanish handball, signing for Garbel Zaragoza (1999-2000). He later played for various ASOBAL League teams including Teka Cantabria (2000–01), BM Granollers (2001-04), Portland San Antonio (2004–05) and Cangas Frigoríficos del Morrazo. In the Portland team he won the ASOBAL League title.

As one of the best goal keepers, with plenty of honours in the game, Venio Losert was given the honour to be the flag bearer in London 2012. Unlike other icons of the handball, Losert has always called himself a "normal, regular and not a showy keeper who only does what's needed to keep the ball out". Losert has always been a key part of the Croatian national team, winning also silver medals in the 1995 and 2005 World Championships. He was voted Croatian player of the year in 1997.

In 2016 he became the goalkeeping coach of Croatian national team in staff of Željko Babić.

Honours
Badel 1862 Zagreb
Croatian First League (6): 1993-94, 1994–95, 1995–96, 1996–97, 1997–98, 1998–99
Croatian Cup (6): 1994, 1995, 1996, 1997, 1998, 1999
EHF Champions League 
Runner-up (4): 1995, 1997, 1998, 1999

Granollers
EHF Cup
Runner-up (1): 2002

Portland San Antonio
Liga ASOBAL (1): 2004-05
Supercopa ASOBAL (1): 2004-05

Barcelona
Copa del Rey (2): 2007, 2009
Supercopa ASOBAL (2): 2007, 2009
Pirenees Leagues (2): 2006-07, 2007–08

Individual
Franjo Bučar State Award for Sport: 1996 and 2004
Best Croatian handballer of 1998 by: CHF & Sportske novosti

References

External links

Official Olympic Reports

Croatian male handball players
Olympic handball players of Croatia
Olympic gold medalists for Croatia
Olympic bronze medalists for Croatia
FC Barcelona Handbol players
Liga ASOBAL players
Handball players at the 1996 Summer Olympics
Handball players at the 2004 Summer Olympics
Handball players at the 2008 Summer Olympics
Handball players at the 2012 Summer Olympics
People from Zavidovići
Croats of Bosnia and Herzegovina
1976 births
Living people
Sportspeople from Slavonski Brod
RK Zagreb players
Olympic medalists in handball
Medalists at the 2012 Summer Olympics
Medalists at the 2004 Summer Olympics
Croatian expatriate sportspeople in Spain
Medalists at the 1996 Summer Olympics
BM Granollers players
Vive Kielce players